David P. Wilkinson is a distinguished professor of chemical and electrochemical engineering in the University of British Columbia and a specialist in the field of electrochemical sciences and technologies.

In 2020, he was named a member of the Order of Canada, Canada's highest civilian honors, recognizing Canadians “whose service shapes our society, whose innovations ignite our imaginations, and whose compassion unites our communities,” because of his contributions to electrochemical engineering and sciences, particularly the development of fuel cell technology.

Awards 

Among his numerous honors are the R.A. McLachlan Memorial award, the R.S. Jane Memorial Award, the UBC Faculty of Applied Science Dean’s Medal of Distinction  and the University of British Columbia Killam Research Award. He is also a fellow of the Engineering Institute of Canada, the Canadian Academy of Engineering, the Chemical Institute of Canada and the Royal Society of Canada.

Career 

Wilkinson joined the UBC’s Department of Chemical and Biological Engineering in 2004 as a Canada Research Chair in Clean Energy and Fuel Cells after he working previously in various industry and government positions such as Moli Energy Vice President of Research where he was part of the team that developed the world’s first commercial rechargeable lithium AA battery, and Ballard Power Systems, which he assisted in fuel cell and hydrogen technology over the course of his 13 years at the company.  Wilkinson was also a principal research officer and group leader at the National Research Council Institute for Fuel Cell Innovation, where he established a research and development group and laboratory in polymer electrolyte membrane fuel cell technology.

References

External links 

  

Academic staff of the University of British Columbia
Living people
University of British Columbia alumni
Canadian chemical engineers
Chemical engineering academics
Year of birth missing (living people)